Turkey competed at the 2011 Summer Universiade in Shenzhen, Guangdong, China from 12 August to 23 August 2011. A total of 81 athletes were a part of the Turkish team competing in eight sports branches.

Turkey finished in ninth position on the medal tally, including seven gold, seven silver and eight bronze medals.

Medal table

Athletics

Men's

Women's

Basketball

Turkey has qualified a men's team.

Men's tournament

Chess

Turkey has qualified a men's and women's team.

Judo

Men's

Women's

Taekwondo

Men's

Women's

Volleyball

Turkey has qualified a men's team.

Men's tournament

Water polo 

Turkey has qualified a men's team.

Men's tournament

Weightlifting 

Men's

Women's

References

2011 in Turkish sport
Nations at the 2011 Summer Universiade
2011